Amerila timolis, or Timolis' frother, is a moth of the subfamily Arctiinae. It was described by Walter Rothschild in 1914. It is found in New Guinea and Queensland, Australia.

The forewings are pale brown with large translucent windows that have a dark brown bar. The hindwings are pale brown.

Subspecies
Amerila timolis timolis (Australia: Queensland)
Amerila timolis papuana (Rothschild, 1914) (Papua New Guinea, Vulcan Island: Manam)

References

Rothschild, W. (1914). "Arctiidae, subfamilie Arctiinae". In: Seitz, A. Die Gross-Schmetterlinge der Erde. 10: 236-263, Taf. 13, 19-30, Alfred Kernen: Stuttgart.
Turner, A. J. (1915). "Studies in Australian Lepidoptera". Proceedings of the Royal Society of Queensland. 27: 11-57, Brisbane.

Moths described in 1914
Amerilini
Moths of New Guinea
Moths of Australia